Ron Collins (born September 30, 1971) is a former professional American football player.

Ron was born in Tokyo, Japan, and played as an offensive lineman with the NFL Europe's Frankfurt Galaxy in their 1996 and 1997 seasons. He also played in the NFL off-season and on NFL practice squads with the San Francisco 49ers, Jacksonville Jaguars, Indianapolis Colts, Miami Dolphins, Chicago Bears. In college, Collins played for the Fresno State Bulldogs.

References

1971 births
Living people
Sportspeople from Tokyo
American football offensive linemen
Fresno State Bulldogs football players